Arnaldo Sánchez Catalán (born 18 September 1966) is a Filipino prelate of the Catholic Church who has been an apostolic nuncio since 2022, currently Apostolic Nuncio to Rwanda and titular Archbishop of Apollonia.

Biography
Arnaldo Sánchez Catalán was born on 18 September 1966 in Manila, Philippines. He was ordained a priest for the Archdiocese of Manila on 25 March 1994.

He entered the diplomatic service of the Holy See on 1 July 2001, and served in the pontifical representations in Zambia, Kuwait, Mexico, Honduras, Turkey, India, Argentina, Canada, Philippines and China (Taipei).

On 31 January 2022, Pope Francis appointed him Titular Archbishop of Apollonia and Apostolic Nuncio to Rwanda.

See also
 List of heads of the diplomatic missions of the Holy See

References

External links

Living people
1966 births
Apostolic Nuncios to Rwanda